Lee Jae-myung (born 22 December 1964) is a South Korean politician serving as a member of the National Assembly and the leader of the Democratic Party of Korea. Lee was the nominee of the Democratic Party in the 2022 South Korean presidential election. He was the 35th Governor of Gyeonggi Province from 2018 to 2021.

Born to a poor family in Andong, Lee became a factory worker after primary school and became disabled due to workplace injuries. Lee earned middle and high school equivalency diplomas and studied at Chung-Ang University, earning his law degree in 1986. As a human rights and labour lawyer, Lee organized with Minbyun and advocated for opening a new hospital in Seongnam.

Lee entered politics in 2005 and unsuccessfully contested a few elections. He was elected Mayor of Seongnam in 2010 and won a second term in 2014. He resigned in 2018 for a successful run for Governor of Gyeonggi Province. Lee ran for president in 2022, winning the party nomination, but losing to Yoon Suk-yeol in the general election. Afterwards, Lee was elected as a member of the National Assembly, and became the leader of the Democratic Party.

Early life
Lee was born on 22 December 1964 in Andong, the fifth of seven children. According to his first-grade report card, he was quite stubborn and his grades were normal, but he played well with his classmates and was courageous.

Lee grew up in poverty, and as a result of his family's lack of funds, he would frequently forgo social activities and relied on the generosity of school faculty to attend field trips. He has cited fishing along the creek with his friends as being one of his favorite past times.

When Lee graduated from elementary school, the South Korean public school system did not give free education for middle and high school. His father spent most of the family's money on gambling, and Lee's family left Andong to find work.

Child factory worker 
Lee's family moved to Seongnam, an industrial planned city built during the administration of Park Chung-hee to concentrate industry outside of Seoul. Seongnam was mostly populated by poor people, who were often coerced to move there by the government.

Like other children from poor families, Lee worked in handmade necklace factory instead of middle school. After the necklace factory went bankrupt, he moved to a company called Dongma Rubber. Lee at this time was not old enough to legally work in South Korea, so he worked under various pseudonyms. Lee injured his finger at Dongma Rubber.

After the accident, Lee left Dongma Rubber and worked for Daeyang Industry. In a second workplace injury, an industrial press crushed his wrist joint. The injury was untreated and caused a disability in his arm. Later, he was exempted from military service. He is a contemporary registered disabled person.

While working at Daeyang Industry, Lee saw a group of students wearing school uniforms and he developed a desire to attend university. He enrolled in classes to pass the exams. He passed the high school entrance examination and earned a middle school diploma in 1978. Two years later in 1980, he passed the university entrance examination and obtained a high school diploma.

Lee's personal experience with crushing poverty inspired his political philosophy of 'Eokgang Buyak', which aims to curb the privileges and excesses of the powerful and support the poorest segments of society.

Civil rights attorney 
Based on his entrance examination scores, Lee was accepted into Chung-Ang University's College of Law on a scholarship. In 1986, upon graduating from college, he passed the bar exam and entered the Judicial Research and Training Institute for two years in order to join the bar. Lee opposed the authoritarian regime of Chun Doo-hwan. Lee originally intended to become a judge or prosecutor for the prestige and pay, but he was inspired by a lecture from Roh Moo-hyun to become a human rights and labour lawyer, like Roh and Moon Jae-in. He set up his practice in Seongnam.

After opening his own lawyer's office, Lee organized for labour and human rights with the lawyers' organization Minbyun, working with the heads of labour counselling centres in Incheon and Gwangju. In 1995, he started a civic movement as a founding member of the 'Seongnam Citizens' Association'. He gained fame as a lawyer and social activism around the 'Park View preferencial sale case', where an investigation suggested corruption in the awarding of building permits and preferential sales of property in Bundang to government officials.

Around 2002 two general hospitals in Seongnam closed. Lee started a movement to build a new municipal hospital. The city council, which was then controlled by the Grand National Party, rejected the residents' initiative ordinance in just 47 seconds. Lee's group protested the council, and Lee was wanted for obstructing official duties of a public official. Afterwards, Lee realized that he could not change society through social movements, and he decided to enter politics.

Political career
On 23 August 2005, Lee joined the then-ruling Uri Party, a predecessor of the Democratic Party of Korea, and declared his candidacy for mayor of Seongnam. He ran as a candidate in the local elections in 2006, but was defeated by 23.75% of the vote due to poor public opinion about the Uri Party and Roh administration at the time.

In the 2007 presidential election, Lee Jae-Myung served as the senior deputy chief of the Office of the Presidential Candidate Chung Dong-young of the Grand Unified Democratic New Party. In the 2008 general election, he applied for a nomination in the constituency of Seongnam Jungwon A, but was defeated by Cho Sung-jun in the primary election, and was nominated in the Seongnam Bundang A constituency. However, Lee suffered from another defeat with 33.23% of the votes under difficult circumstances, as the constituency was a traditional stronghold of an opposing party who had just won the Presidential election under Lee Myung-bak.

After the 2008 election, Lee served as the Democratic Party's deputy spokesperson at the request of the Democratic Party's leader Chung Sye-kyun.

Mayor of Seongnam 2010-2018 
Lee earned his political reputation during his tenure as Seongnam's mayor. As mayor, he gained recognition for creating Seongnam's social welfare program, widely regarded as one of the most comprehensive in the nation.

He significantly improved the city's financial situation. From 2010 to 2014, Lee announced a moratorium on payments of debt incurred from the developing Pangyo Techno Valley. While Lee was praised by some for this announcement, others criticized Lee and accused him of pulling a political stunt. Critics called the moratorium unnecessary because the city had never been forced to repay the debt immediately, and most of the debt had been largely covered by the significant 2.5-fold increase of the city's municipal bond assets.

At the same time, he used the money saved to expand social welfare programs, such as offering a universal basic income for young people, free school uniforms and free postnatal care. These programs later became the foundation of Lee's policy platform for a universal basic income.

Lee is noted for his decision to ban dog meat and to shut down dog slaughtering facilities in Moran Market. The dog slaughtering facilities had long been a subject of heated debate over their morality, the rights of animals, and their environmental impact.  In 2016, Lee, an animal rights advocate, signed an agreement with shop owners that prohibited the display and slaughter of live dogs at the market. The city helped business owners transition to other businesses, but did not offer any direct compensation for their closure.

Lee won reelection in 2014 and served another four-year term as Seongnam's mayor until 2018.

2017 presidential campaign 
While serving as mayor, Lee made a presidential bid in 2017 after former president Park Geun-hye was impeached on corruption allegations. In the Democratic Party's primary election, Lee placed third behind Moon Jae-in, the former party chairman, and Ahn Hee-jung, the governor of South Chungcheong Province. Lee is part of the progressive wing in the Democratic Party.

Governor of Gyeonggi Province 
Following his loss in the presidential election, Lee ran for Governor of Gyeonggi Province, which encompasses much of the Seoul Capital Area and has a population of over 13 million. Lee received acclaim for his response to the COVID-19 pandemic as governor.

In March 2020, when the nation's first COVID-19 wave took place, following an infection cluster among followers of the Shincheonji Church of Jesus, Lee visited the residence of the organization's founder in Gyeonggi Province. The founder had refused to be tested for COVID-19 or to share church event attendance records for contact tracing. Lee warned the founder of the potential legal and administrative actions, and secured the founder's cooperation.

Lee also announced a special order for all foreigners working in Gyeonggi Province to be tested for COVID-19. Seoul announced similar policies but changed them to recommendation after facing criticism. Lee's special order resulted in finding 329 new positive cases.

In February 2021, a year after the first Central Disaster and Safety Countermeasures Headquarters (CDSCH) meeting was held to tackle the COVID-19 pandemic, it was revealed that Lee attended only three meetings, while the average number of meetings attended by provincial and municipal leaders was 68.5. In response, Lee said in April 2021 that he used his time effectively in addressing more critical issues. Chung Sye-kyun publicly shared his frustration that Lee would not have made such a statement if he was well aware of the government's efforts in containing the virus and vaccinating the public.

Throughout 2021, Lee was partially at odds with the central government over his plan to provide COVID-19 disaster relief funds to all residents of Gyeonggi Province.

Lee frequently stated in office, "I have kept an average of 95 percent of my campaign promises while serving the public", and "Even if I might have to experience a political loss, I believe in the collective intelligence of the public, and push forward on the right things in order to bring about results. That is my style".

2022 presidential campaign 

Lee declared his bid in the 2022 presidential election in July 2021, and emphasized policies that would ensure equality for people of all backgrounds in the nation, and heighten Korea's standing abroad as a nation that provides public goods for global communities. "We are situated in a time of a great transformation," Lee said in a televised address immediately following his nomination. "My first objective, if I am elected president, would be to help Korea take the lead in fighting climate change, the global pandemic and the ever-speedy technological revolution. My second objective would be to help this nation achieve economic growth during this time of great struggle. When it comes to policies to boost the people's welfare and well-being, there is no left or right; there is no ideological differences. I am ready to try anything and everything if it means the people can lead better livelihoods."

Lee became the nominee of the Democratic Party of Korea on 10 October 2021. Lee won a majority of the votes in the primary and made it directly to the presidential election without a runoff. In his acceptance speech, Lee expressed his ambition to create the new Republic of Korea through reform and practice.

In the general election, Lee lost to Yoon Suk-yeol of the People Power Party, 47.8% to 48.6%.

2022 South Korean by-election 
On 7 May 2022, Lee declared his candidacy in the June 2022 South Korean by-elections running for Incheon Gyeyang District B vacant seat in the National Assembly. Lee won the seat in the elections on 1 June 2022.

The motion for arrest, which was reapproved by the prosecution, was rejected along with a large number of rebel votes within the party.

Political positions

Economic and social policy 

Lee tends to run takes a policy close to the centre-left in the Democratic Party of Korea. Lee advocates for New Deal liberalism economically and respects the policies of Franklin D. Roosevelt. On 10 October 2021, Lee said "We will change the graph of economic growth upward with a strong state-led economic revival policy. I'll learn from Roosevelt, who overcame the Great Depression with left-wing policy (좌파 정책)".

Lee announced his overarching economic policy vision as "Transformative and Fair Growth". Lee's view on the Korean economy is that many problems have arisen from the slowdown of economic growth. Low growth leads to fewer opportunities for younger generations, causing fiercer competition and social unrest. This is especially relevant for Korea, as the rules and institutions that have been designed for a high-growth catch-up economy no longer work well for an advanced economy.

Lee asserts that the slowdown of economic growth is related to the unfairness and polarization in many areas of the economy: for example, the gap between big monopolies and small and medium-sized enterprises, the differences between platforms and irregular workers, and inequalities in the real estate market. Unfair conventions distort people's economic incentives in a way that encourages rent-seeking activities, causing serious inefficiency in resource allocation. 

Another aspect that Lee sees as vital for the Korean economy is recent global trends in technological progress, such as energy and digital transformation, which could cause crises or provide new opportunities depending on policy responses.

Lee's growth strategy, "Transformative and Fair Growth" comprises a set of policies to make the economy fairer and more transformative. Innovations and transformation can be expedited on the basis of right incentives and fairer institutions. This strategy includes industrial policies for a "Green New Deal" and digital transformation, education reforms to help people adapt to the new environment, balancing market power among economic entities, measures for fair competition and labour market justice, and social safety nets to share risks related to the transformation.

The overall policy stance is close to social liberal and moderate-progressivism, but there are also some economic liberal tendencies, such as real estate tax cuts and partial corporate deregulation. This tendency toward economic liberalism has shifted to the right compared to the past, and has increased a lot before and after the 2022 South Korean presidential election.

Universal basic income

One of Lee's signature 2022 presidential campaign pledges was a promise to implement universal basic income. Lee implemented various basic income programs for residents during his time as mayor and governor.

During the 2022 campaign, Lee promised to introduce basic income to young people, farmers and fishermen first. Later, the program would expand to include all citizens, and the basic income amounts would increase. As part of this plan, Lee sought to link the basic income to a carbon tax and land tax.

Lee pledged to introduce a universal basic income scheme at the national level for the first time in the world. Additional basic income would be considered for farmers, children, the elderly, and the disabled. Lee proposed the basic income plan would be financed by land value tax and carbon tax. Lee stressed that these taxes were necessary to curb real estate speculation and reduce carbon emissions.

Government-backed loans
Lee advocated for these government-backed loan to the public as a safer alternative to borrowing money from loan sharks or private money lenders.

Technology
Lee emphasises the importance of data in digital transformation. During his tenure as the governor of Gyeonggi Province, Lee ordered that administrative official documents should use the open document format (ODF) instead of the previous Hangeul software. He also implemented the world's first data dividend, which returns the portion of the profit created by data-related business to the consumers who actually created the data. He used data analysis to combat African swine fever and prosecute illegal construction companies. He provided a mobile app to monitor the movements of COVID-19 confirmed patients without violating privacy and revealing personal information, using data encryption technology. Lee argues that the monopoly situation of big platform companies with network effects could be as an obstacle to fair growth of the digital sector, and argues that workers employed by platform enterprises should have new types of employment contracts so that they could be better protected in the digital era.

Lee states that South Korea should have future-oriented economic policies that take into account the role of artificial intelligence and its effect on society. He has stated that this shift will require government support to alleviate difficulties that might arise from the economic adjustment.

Education

According to Lee's election promise, Lee planned to avoid focusing on grades and numbers and proceed in the direction of strengthening student's capabilities. In middle school, Lee said that teachers would determine student performance through summative assessment, and that he planned to launch a basic math curriculum through the 'high school credit system' in high school to make up for underachievement. He is also considered introducing AI-based personalized learning and evaluation in some subjects, such as mathematics, to strengthen individualized learning and evaluation throughout elementary and middle school.

Lee proposed an 'outdoor school' that fosters the challenges, adventures, cooperation, and curiosity necessary for adolescent growth. It promised to prepare and introduce a curriculum of about 10 hours per semester.

Youth policy
Lee promised universal basic income and universal basic loans specifically for youth. He planned to provide one-time employment benefits to youth that voluntarily resigned from a job, in order to support job searching and career development. Lee planned to lower student loan interest rates and allow university tuition to be proportional to the credits students take each semester. Lastly, he planned to provide universal basic housing to youth and reform the housing market to help low-income youth buy and own their own homes.

LGBT rights
Lee said on 29 November 2021, that homosexuality should be recognized, and that discrimination against homosexuals is no different from discrimination against skin color or disability. He supported anti-discrimination laws and said legislation should be made through social consensus.

Feminism
South Korean media characterized Lee Jae-Myung as being hostile to feminism and no different from his fellow 2022 presidential opponent Yoon Seok-youl. On 8 November 2021, Lee distributed an article to participants of the National Election Commission stating, "If Lee Jae-Myung differentiates himself from the Moon Jae-in government's feminist-first policy, he can gain support from young men". On 10 November, Lee shared a post written by a supporter on DC Inside on his Facebook page, which read, "Candidate Lee Jae-Myung, please stop the 'feminism of madness' (of the Moon Jae-In government). If you promise to do so, I will vote [for you] with great pleasure".

Progressive politician Sim Sang-jung criticized Lee Jae-myung as a clear "anti-feminist". Ahn Cheol-soo, a centre-right conservative liberal, also criticized Lee Jae-myung's pledge on gender as "misogyny".

However, some point out that Lee Jae-Myung's remarks on feminism are more of a populist investigation than a real policy objection to women's rights. Lee Jae-Myung was pro-choice and advocated expanding the rights of abortion women in medical insurance. In this regard, it received positive reviews from feminists. The TIME, an American magazine, described Lee's women policy as "progressive".

He strongly opposes the "abolition of the Ministry of Gender Equality and Family" (여성가족부 폐지) supported by the right-wing conservative camp.

In the 2022 presidential election in South Korea, Lee Jae-myung pledged to enact a dating violence punishment law, strengthen support for victims of sex crimes, stabilize housing for single-person female households, establish a sexist workplace report and supervision system, support sanitary pads, and free HPV vaccine.

Foreign policy 
Lee announced a comprehensive foreign policy plan on 22 August 2021. Lee emphasized that the aim of foreign policy should be focused on improving the quality of the people and it should be practical to enhance national interest.

North Korea
Lee stated that he will continue the efforts of previous liberal presidents to conduct peace talks with North Korea, citing President Kim Dae-jung's Sunshine Policy, President Roh Moo-hyun's summit with Kim Jong-il, and President Moon Jae-in's peace talks with North Korea.

Lee favours the approach of a conditional rollback of sanctions on North Korea in attempting to denuclearize North Korea. While he believes in easing of sanctions, he also advocates immediate restoration of sanctions if North Korea fails to keep its denuclearization promises.

United States
Lee supports good trade relations with the US. He also believes in good relations with the US military, which has its main bases in his province. However, he has criticized the US-deployed THAAD anti-missile system for prompting Chinese economic retaliation. Later, he said that as the THAAD is already deployed, the country must make a new decision on the US-ROK alliance and the progress of denuclearisation of North Korea.

Lee expressed his position on the issue between the U.S. and China in South Korea's foreign policy, saying that the U.S. is Korea's only ally and that friendly relations with the U.S. are the most important.

China
Lee stated that while the United States is South Korea's only ally, China is also a strategic partner. He said, "There is no reason to narrow our range of movement by choosing one or the other side. It is competent diplomacy to make the U.S. and China choose to cooperate with us."

Lee criticize China for robbing and invading Korean culture.

Lee insisted that if a Chinese fishing boat breaks into South Korean waters in the 2022 South Korean presidential election, he will definitely sink it. The Hankyoreh criticized this as "anti-China populism" (혐중 포퓰리즘). However, the Hankyoreh also pointed out that China's "roughly and unconscientious patriotism" (거칠고 인하무인식 애국주의) is the cause of South Korea's anti-China sentiment.

Japan
In relations with Japan, Lee promotes a "two track strategy" to actively promote economic, social, and diplomatic exchange and cooperation while also resolutely dealing with historical issues, territorial sovereignty, and the life and safety of the people.

Lee has a certain pro-American tendency, such as strong support for military alliance and military cooperation with the United States, but he is very opposed to military training between the three countries in which Japan participates and accuses conservatives who support it as "far-right Chinil acts" (극단적 친일 행위). South Korean liberals are hostile to traditional pre-U.S. hegemonic countries like China and Japan.

On 1 March 2018, Lee Jae-myung said that Japan which he referred to as "an aggressor country" (침략국가), rather than Korea, should have been divided into two countries following the Pacific War.

Criticism
Unlike most South Korean liberals, Lee Jae-Myung often speaks favorably of former dictator Park Chung-hee. Lee Jae-Myung said on 2 November 2021, "President Park Chung-hee created the Gyeongbu Expressway to open the way for manufacturing-oriented industrialization," adding, "The Lee Jae-Myung administration will build an 'energy highway' that will open a new future while speeding through the decarbonised era." The Dong-A Ilbo, a conservative media outlet in South Korea, said Lee Jae-Myung's state-led policies are closer to Park Chung-hee's authoritarianism than left-wing populism based on social equality.

When Lee Jae-Myung evaluated Chun Doo-hwan's economic performance favourably on 11 December 2021, he was criticized by South Korea's liberal camp. The Justice Party's Sim Sang-jung said of Lee Jae-myung, "You seem to have become a presidential candidate for the [conservative] People Power Party while trying to differentiate yourself from the Moon Jae-in government". The People Power Party's presidential candidate, Yoon Seok-youl, sarcastically said, "You can be our party's presidential candidate". In an editorial to The Hankyoreh, a South Korean centre-left liberal journalist who was critical of the dictatorship in the past strongly criticized Lee Jae-myung for forgetting his (liberal) "values" to win the votes of conservative voters.

Controversies

"Unanswered Questions," an investigative journalism television programme run by Seoul Broadcasting System, aired an episode questioning the links between the local Mafia organisation in Seongnam city, Lee, and Eun Su-mi, the current mayor of the city.

Lee was accused of giving up "Happiness," the dog he adopted during his time as a mayor of Seongnam. When Lee became moved into his new residence as Gyeonggi provincial governor, he left the dog at Seongnam City Hall. Lee explained that the dog was adopted by the city, not by an individual, and the dog was later adopted by a new family.

During the 2018 gubernatorial election, actress Kim Boo-sun reported that she had an affair with Lee in 2007–2009.

In 2018 during the Gyeonggi gubernational election, Rep. Jeon Hae-cheol filed a complaint against the Twitter account @08_hkkim for publishing false information on elections. The police reported that they believed the account belonged to Lee's spouse. Prosecutors dropped the case, citing a lack of evidence.

In July 2020, the Supreme Court found Lee not guilty of breaching campaign law during a television debate for Gyeonggi provincial governor. In the debate, Lee denied that he had attempted to admit his brother to a psychiatric hospital. The Court and its lower courts determined that the allegation was true. However, deferring to freedom of expression during political campaigns, the Supreme Court said Lee did not "actively" distort the facts - and therefore did not breach campaign law - when he lied. Lee was represented by several lawyers including two former Supreme Court justices.

Lee Jae-Myung, since late 2022 has been at the center of an investigation regarding corporate donations and favors when he was mayor of Seongnam and regarding donations to the cities football team. On 10 January 2023, he went to the prosecutors office where it was said to be the first time that Lee Jae-Myung was questioned as a suspect in the case. However the opposition says that this is due to the Yoon Suk-Yeol government trying to take away from their failures while in office. This also marked the first time that an opposition leader was brought in for questioning regarding a criminal case, following the South Korean transfer to democracy.

Electoral history

Primary election

Authored books

See also
 Andrew Yang - He is an American politician who claims universal basic income. He supports Lee's basic income policy.
 Basic Income Party
 Future Democratic Party

References

External links
 Lee Jae-myung on Twitter

|-

1964 births
Living people
20th-century South Korean lawyers
21st-century South Korean lawyers
Chung-Ang University alumni
Mayors of Seongnam
Minjoo Party of Korea politicians
People from Andong
Populism in South Korea
South Korean politicians with disabilities
South Korean Protestants
Universal basic income in South Korea
Governors of Gyeonggi Province